is a Japanese manga artist and actor from Shizuoka, Japan, known for his dark humor and social criticism. In early 1981, after graduating from Tama Art University, he began to work as an advertising illustrator for Kirin Brewery Company. He maintained his regular day job, while developing his manga work, until 1994.  His first manga series was Ereki na Haru, a strip launched in 1985. He has been teaching at the School of Progressive Arts in Kobe Design University since 2006.

Known for his "gag" manga, Shiriagari keeps his humor close to the dramatic aspects of life. "I always have the choice of telling it with laughter," he said in an interview about his storytelling. His series appears regularly in Comic Beam and experimental magazine AX.

Works

Manga
 Ereki na Haru (エレキな春), 1985
 Ora Rokoko da (おらあロココだ) Hakusensha 1987
 O.Shi.Go.To. (おしごと), Hanako / Magazine House, 1992
 Koisomore-sensei (コイソモレ先生), 1993
 Hinshi no Esseiisto (瀕死のエッセイスト), 1993–2002
 Ryuusei Kachou (流星課長), Take Shobou, 1996
 Yajikita in Deep (弥次喜多 in DEEP), 1997–2002
 Futago no Oyaji (双子のオヤジ), 1998–2001
 Jijö Oyaji 2000 (時事おやじ2000), 2000
 Haikai rōjin Don Quichote (徘徊老人ドンキホーテ), 2001
 Shin Hige no OL Sasako Yabuuchi (真・ヒゲのOL藪内笹子), Enterbrain, 2002–2004
 Chikyu Boei Ke no Hitobito (地球防衛家のヒトビト), Asahishimbunsha, 2004
 Mayonaka no Mizukokikado (真夜中の水戸黄門), Comic Beam, 2004–2005
 Mayonaka no Hige no Yaji-san Kita-san (真夜中のヒゲの弥次さん喜多さん), 2005
 Hogaraka Shinjiru Kimi (ほがらか信じる君)
 Gero Gero Pusuka (ゲロゲロプースカ) Comic Beam, 2006

Films
 1997 - Tokyo biyori
 2004 - Cutie Honey
 2004 - Koi no mon
 2005 - Yaji and Kita: The Midnight Pilgrims
 2007 - Quiet room ni yōkoso

Video games
 Logos Panic Goaisatu (ロゴスパニックごあいさつ) - characters design
 WarioWare: D.I.Y. (メイド イン 俺) - comics

Reception and awards
Kotobuki's series Jiji Oyaji 2000 and Yuruyuru Oyaji won the Bungeishunjū Manga Award in 2000.

He received the Tezuka Osamu Cultural Prize excellence Award in 2001 for his manga Yajikita in Deep.

References

External links
  
 Kotobuki Shiriagari manga works at Media Arts Database

See also
 Sukiyaki Western Django

1958 births
Japanese male actors
Living people
Manga artists from Shizuoka (city)
Recipients of the Medal with Purple Ribbon